Bánh chuối (literally "banana cake") is a sweet banana cake or bread pudding from Vietnam. Although its exact ingredients may vary, it is usually made with ripe bananas or plantains, rice flour, coconut milk, sugar, white bread, shredded young coconut, condensed milk, butter, egg, and vanilla extract. In the finished dish, the cooked banana often appears purplish-red in color.

There are two main varieties of bánh chuối:
Bánh chuối nướng (literally "baked banana cake") - This variety of bánh chuối is cooked by baking it in a pan in an oven, giving it a golden-brown, crisp exterior.
Bánh chuối hấp (literally "steamed banana cake") is similar in appearance to the baked version, but some rice starch is added and it is steamed rather than baked, and the outside is not golden-colored.

Additionally, other variations include:
Bánh chuối chiên, which is often sold as a flattened banana and sticky rice fritter.
Bánh chuối khoai, which includes slices of sweet potato.

See also 

 List of banana dishes
 List of steamed foods

References 

Banana dishes
Steamed foods
Bread puddings
Pancakes
Foods containing coconut
Bánh
Vietnamese desserts